The Hingham Naval Ammunition Depot, is a former United States Navy ammunition depot located in Hingham, Massachusetts. At its peak, it employed over 2,400 people. It also consisted of 90 buildings at that time. The Hingham Naval Ammunition Depot Annex was located nearby, and served as a storage area for the depot.

History
From 1903 until 1961, The Hingham Naval Ammunition Depot (originally called the Hingham Naval Reserve) was a major supplier of U.S. munitions, occupying 990 acres (4.0 km2) on the Weymouth Back River (in the section once known as The Hockley). Camp Hingham was a US Navy training camp from 1917 to 1925; its land became part of the depot. At peak capacity in 1945, over 2,400 civilians and military personnel worked there. In the mid 1950s, the site contained over 90 buildings, its own telephone exchange, and 15 cranes. The base was decommissioned in 1961, though the Navy held on to the property until 1971, when it was turned over to the town of Hingham. Today much of the site is now occupied by the town's Bare Cove Park.

Starting in 2016, the U.S. Army Corps of Engineers launched a multi-year investigation into potential hazards in and around the former depot. The Corps identified six areas of interest and searched for detonated pieces of ordnance. So far, nothing has been found.

See also
 List of military installations in Massachusetts

References

External links
HyperWar: Building the Navy's Bases in World War II [Chapter 13]

[Old] Shipwrecks Megan – Northern Atlantic Dive Expeditions – Wreck Diving, Exploration, Training
Wayback Machine

Weapons and ammunition installations of the United States Navy
Installations of the United States Navy in Massachusetts
Ammunition depots of the U.S. Department of Defense
Military installations closed in 1961
Buildings and structures in Hingham, Massachusetts
Closed installations of the United States Navy
1903 establishments in Massachusetts
1961 disestablishments in Massachusetts